Aydem Holding is a conglomerate headquartered in Turkey with companies in energy such as Aydem Energy (formerly called Bereket Energy). Aydem Energy owns Çatalağzı power station and Yatağan power station.

References 

Holding companies of Turkey
Coal companies of Turkey